The 60-yard dash is a sprint covering 60 yards (54.86 m). It is primarily run to evaluate the speed and acceleration of American Major League Baseball players. It is also often used to evaluate the speed of American Football (especially NFL) players (although the 40-yard dash is much more common in football).

In the United States, prior to the adoption of metricized outdoor running tracks, the 60 yard dash was a commonly contested indoor event. Prior to 1983, the 60 yard dash was an event every year at the NCAA Indoor Track and Field Championships. The event was also regularly contested at the AAU Indoor Track and Field Championships.

All-time top 25

Notes

References

Sprint (running)